Malcolm S. Bleecker (October 6, 1906 – April 11, 1941) was an American football player.

He played college football as a tackle for the Columbia Lions and was captain of the 1929 team.  In 1930, he received the Edward Sutliff Brainerd Memorial Prize as the senior "adjudged by his classmates as most worthy of distinction on the ground of his qualities of mind and character."

He later played professional football in the National Football League (NFL) as a guard and center for the Brooklyn Dodgers. He appeared in three NFL games during the 1930 season.

After retiring from football, Bleecker worked as an insurance salesman. He killed himself and his two children in 1941 by gas at his home in Bayside, Queens. He was age 34 at the time of his death.

References

1906 births
1941 deaths
Columbia Lions football players
Brooklyn Dodgers (NFL) players
Players of American football from New York (state)
1941 suicides
Suicides by gas
Suicides in New York City
Murder–suicides in New York City